DXKE (94.1 FM) RMN iFM Surigao is a radio station in the Philippines, owned and operated by the Radio Mindanao Network. The station's studio and transmitter are located along Km. 1 National Highway, Surigao City.

History
The station was established in 1970 under the call letters DXRS on 1150 kHz. In 1978, DXRS was transferred its frequency to 1206 kHz GE75 under the branding Ang Radyo Natin. In 1980s, the station became Radyo Agong. In 2000, it was among the stations rebranded under RMN network. In 2010, RMN DXRS moved to a new frequency at 918 kHz. On December 16, 2021, the station went off the air permanently due to the damage being brought about by Typhoon Odette. In January 2022, RMN DXRS was transferred to a new frequency in FM, 94.1 MHz (with a call letters DXKE) under the name RMN iFM Surigao, where it went back on the air.

References

DXKE
Radio stations established in 1970
Radio stations established in 2022
News and talk radio stations in the Philippines